The Mitsubishi Orion or 4G1 engine is a series of inline-four internal combustion engines introduced by Mitsubishi Motors in around 1977, along with the Astron, Sirius, and Saturn. It was first introduced in the Colt and Colt-derived models in 1978.

4G11

Applications:
Mitsubishi Colt/Mirage A151A
 1977.04-1979.03 Mitsubishi Lancer A141A
 1979.03-1985.02 Mitsubishi Lancer Van A141V/A148V
 1979.11-1983 Mitsubishi Lancer EX A171A

4G12
The 4G12 was not offered by Mitsubishi with fuel injection. This engine is fairly outdated compared to its counterparts that were used in the later Lancers.

Applications:
Mitsubishi Colt/Mirage A152A
1978.04-1979.03 Mitsubishi Lancer A142A
 1979.03-1985.02 Mitsubishi Lancer Van A142V/A149V
1978.04-1981.07 Mitsubishi (Lancer) Celeste A142
Mitsubishi Lancer EX A172A
Mitsubishi Tredia/Cordia A211
Dodge/Plymouth Colt
Plymouth Champ

4G12T
This is the turbocharged version of the 4G12, uses a TC-04 turbocharger from Mitsubishi Heavy Industries. The diameter of the blades in this charger is rather small, at 49 mm, and it spins at 90,000 rpm to provide  of boost. This increased power and torque by about 30 and 25 percent respectively.

4G13
In the Gulf Countries,  gross at 6000 rpm is claimed on the mitsubishi lancer CB1. The 4G13 engine has been produced by Dongan Mitsubishi Motors Engine Manufacturing, in Harbin, China since September 1998.

Mitsubishi Carisma
Mitsubishi Colt / Mirage / Lancer (1983, 1987, 1991, 1995, 2000)
Mitsubishi Dingo
Great Wall Florid
Great Wall Voleex C30
Hyundai Excel
Mitsubishi Space Star
CMC Veryca 1.3
Proton Saga (C20)
Proton Wira / Persona (C90)
Proton Satria / Persona Compact (C90)
Zotye 2008 / Nomad
Emgrand GL
Brilliance BS2
Heyue Tongyue / JAC A13 / JAC J3
2014–2017 Emgrand EC7

4G15

A version of the 4G15 was produced with gasoline multi-port fuel injection. A DOHC MIVEC turbo variant of the engine is also still in production to date (4G15T), serving in the Mitsubishi Colt series, offering  on the latest Colt Version-R (with exhaust enhancement). There was a recorded instance of the engine exceeding  in a 1998 Mitsubishi Mirage sedan. 

The 4G15 is known as one of the longest living Japanese engines ever produced where new variants of the engine are still being produced and used in Chinese cars since 2005. The 4G15 engine has been produced by Dongan Mitsubishi Motors Engine Manufacturing in Harbin, China. And also the new engines have been produced by GAC Mitsubishi Motors, a joint venture from the Hunan province in southern China, since April 2017. 

Mitsubishi Colt / Mirage / Lancer (1983, 1987, 1991, 1995, 2000)
1989–1995 Mitsubishi Mirage (US) (early design: timing belt on driver's side)
1996–2002 Mitsubishi Mirage (US) (later design: engine rotated 180* timing belt on passenger side)
1988–1995 Dodge Colt (early design: timing belt on driver's side)
1988–1996 Eagle Summit (early design: timing belt on driver's side)
1986-1994 Hyundai Excel (US) (early design: timing belt on driver's side)
1987–1992 Proton Saga (C20)
1993–2009 Proton Wira / Persona (C90)
1994–2005 Proton Satria / Persona Compact (C90)
1998–2003 Mitsubishi Dingo
2002–2009 Proton Arena / Jumbuck
2004–2006 Smart Forfour
2005–2010 BYD F3 (4G15S, EFI, distributor-less ignition)
2005–2019 Mitsubishi Colt T120SS MPi (Indonesia). It replaced the 1.3-litre 4G17 in the T120SS in March 2005. 
2005–2009 Mitsubishi Maven
2007–2015 Great Wall Cowry
2008–2013 Great Wall Florid
2008–2009 Soueast V3 Lingyue
2008–2010 Zotye 2008 / Nomad
2009–2014 BYD G3
2009–2013 Youngman Lotus L3
2010–2016 Great Wall Voleex C30
2011–present Haval H6/Haval H6 Sport
2012–2016 Great Wall Voleex C50 
2012–2017 Haval H1 
2014–2016 Geely MK
2015–present Haval H6/Haval H6 Sport Haval H6 Coupe
2016–present Haval H2 
2016–present Yusheng S330
2017–present Zotye T300
2018–present Zotye T500
2018–present Zotye T600
Geely Yuanjing X3
Changan CS35
2009–present Emgrand EC7

SOHC 8-valve (4G15)

This version of the 4G15 is a single overhead camshaft (SOHC) 8-valve, carburetor type engine. It is a in-line four with a compact type combustion chamber.

The engine is an analogue of the Mitsubishi G15B in terms of the engine mechanical specifications except for the valve timing. The G13B is also equipped with jet valves and jet springs.

SPECIFICATIONS:

Total displacement: 

Bore x Stroke: 

Compression Ratio: 9.4:1

SOHC 12-valve (4G15)
A 12-valve version (two intake and one exhausts per cylinder) of the 1468 cc 4G15 engine. It entered production in 1989, for the third generation Mitsubishi Mirage/Lancer. It was available with a carburettor or fuel injection, producing  in Japanese market trim at the time of introduction. Later, a natural gas-powered version was added and in 1991 a new lean-burn technology called "Mitsubishi Vertical Vortex" (MVV) was introduced on this engine.

4G16
The 4G16 displaces  from a  bore and stroke. This engine was mainly offered in European markets, where it suited local tax regulations.

Applications:
Mitsubishi Colt/Mirage
Mitsubishi Lancer

4G17
The 4G17 displaces . It is a SOHC 12-valve engine.

Applications:
1991-2005 Mitsubishi Colt T120SS (Indonesia); production stopped due to Euro 2 emission standard that requires usage of gasoline-direct injection system, engine control unit / module (ECU/ECM), and catalytic converter usage.

4G18
It uses a COP (Coil-On-Plug, also known as Plug-top coil) ignition rely on one coil to fire two cylinders, one of which was by spark plug wire. The 4G18 engine has been produced by Dongan Mitsubishi Motors Engine Manufacturing , in Harbin, China since April 2010.

Mitsubishi Colt Plus (Taiwan)
Mitsubishi Kuda
Mitsubishi Lancer
Mitsubishi Space Star
2010-2011 Foton Midi
Hafei Saima
Proton Waja
Zotye 2008 / Nomad / Hunter / T200, 2007-2009 78 kW
2005-2010 BYD F3
Hafei Saibao
Foton Midi
MPM Motors PS160
Brilliance BS2
Brilliance BS4
Landwind X6
Zotye T600
Zotye T700
Mitsubishi Lancer (China)
Soueast Lioncel
Haima Haifuxing
Tagaz Aquila 2013 to 2014
2009–2013 Emgrand EC7
Mitsubishi Pajero iO (3-door pre-facelift, Australia)

4G19

The DOHC MIVEC 4G19 displaces 1.3–litres and features four valves per cylinder. It was introduced in 2002, powering the then-new Mitsubishi Colt.

Applications:
Mitsubishi Colt

See also
 List of Mitsubishi engines
 List of Hyundai engines
 List of engines used in Chrysler products

References

Mitsubishi Motors Technical Review 2003, p.111

Orion
Straight-four engines
Gasoline engines by model